Sullivan is a crater on Mercury. Its name was adopted by the International Astronomical Union (IAU) in 1976, and is named for the American architect Louis Sullivan.

Sullivan is west of the smaller but younger Futabatei crater.

References 

Impact craters on Mercury